Mark D. Sickles (born February 18, 1957) is an American politician serving as the Delegate from the 43rd District of the Virginia House of Delegates since 2004. He is a member of the Democratic Party.

Sickles serves as the Chair of the Health, Welfare and Institutions Committee, Vice Chair of the Appropriations Committee and as a member in the Privileges and Elections and Rules Committee.

As an openly gay man, Sickles is the second LGBT person elected to the Virginia House of Delegates and the Virginia General Assembly (after Adam Ebbin).

Sickles is one of five openly LGBT people serving in the Virginia General Assembly (alongside Adam Ebbin, Mark Levine, Dawn Adams, and Danica Roem).

Early life and education
Sickles was born in Arlington, Virginia. He received a Bachelor of Science degree in Forest Management from Clemson University in 1981, a Master of Science in industrial management from Georgia Tech in 1984, and a second M.S. in Technology and Science Policy two years later.

Sickles is a fellow with the Sorensen Institute for Political Leadership at the University of Virginia.

Legislative issues and bills
Tragedy struck in Fairfax County in 2018 when a nine-year-old boy was killed by a motorized classroom partition. In response, Sickles drafted legislation prohibiting anyone from operating a motorized partition when students are in a room at school unless the wall has a safety sensor installed with it. He named the bill the Wesley Charles Lipicky Act in honor of the victim. The bill passed the legislature and was signed into law in May 2019.

Sickles was instrumental in the effort to advance the Equal Rights Amendment (ERA) in Virginia in early 2019. As the only two Democrats on the Subcommittee No. 1 of the House Privileges and Elections Committee, Mark Sickles and Schuyler VanValkenburg (D-) supported the effort make Virginia the 38th state to ratify the ERA. However, the Republicans on Subcommittee No. 1 all voted against the bills.

Later, Sickles tried to bring one of the bills before the full committee, but the motion failed on another party-line vote. Still, Sickles was commended for his efforts by Ratify, a leading organization working to pass the Equal Rights Amendment.

Personal life
In an op-ed for The Washington Post, which noted the striking-down in the Eastern Virginia U.S. District Court of the constitutionality of the state's ban on same-sex marriage, Sickles publicly came out as gay. This made him the second openly LGBT member of the Virginia General Assembly, alongside Sen. Adam Ebbin, who was out before his election to the House in 2003.

Electoral history
In 2001, Sickles ran for the House and lost by 313 votes to freshman Republican Tom Bolvin, who had defeated 11-term Democrat Gladys Keating two years earlier. Sickles had been a volunteer staffer for Keating previously.

Sickles defeated Bolvin in a 2003 rematch, 53.8%-46.1%.

References

External links
 (campaign finance)

Project Vote Smart - Representative Mark D. Sickles (VA) profile
Follow the Money - Mark D. Sickles
2005 2003 2001 campaign contributions

1957 births
Living people
Democratic Party members of the Virginia House of Delegates
Clemson University alumni
Georgia Tech alumni
People from Fairfax County, Virginia
People from Arlington County, Virginia
LGBT state legislators in Virginia
Gay politicians
21st-century American politicians